Killucan is a civil parish in County Westmeath, Ireland.

Killucan is the sole civil parish in the barony of Farbill in the Province of Leinster.

The neighbouring civil parishes are:
Killagh, Killulagh and Rathconnell  to the north
Killaconnigan and Killyon (both in County Meath) to the east
Clonard (in County Meath) to the south
Enniscoffey, Lynn, Mullingar and Pass of Kilbride to the west

Townlands
Killucan civil parish comprises 77 townlands: 
 
  Aghamore
  Annaskinnan
  Balleighter Lowtown
  Ballinla
  Balloughter Hightown
  Ballyhaw
  Balrowan (Pakenham)
  Balrowan (Rowely) & Kerinstown
  Banagher
  Brutonstown
  Brutonstown Little
  Castledown
  Chanonstown
  Cloghanstown
  Clonbore
  Cloncrave
  Cloncullen
  Clonfad
  Clonreagh
  Coolcahan
  Corbally
  Corbetstown
  Correllstown
  Craddanstown
  Creggstown
  Crossanstown
  Curristown
  Cushinstown
  Derryboy
  Derrymore
  Edmondstown
  Glebe
  Grange Beg
  Grange More
  Greatdown
  Greenan
  Grehanstown
  Griffinstown
  Heathstown
  Higginstown
  Hightown Balloughter
  Hodgestown
  Huntingdon
  Hydepark
  Joristown Lower
  Joristown Upper
  Kerinstown & Balrowan (Rowley)
  Killucan
  Kinnegad
  Knockaville
  Knockmant
  Knocksimon
  Lisnabin
  Lowtown Balleighter
  Lunestown
  Mill Land
  Millerstown
  Monganstown
  Mucklin
  Mylestown
  Newdown
  Porterstown (Cooke)
  Porterstown (Napper)
  Priesttown
  Raharney
  Raharney Little
  Rathbrack
  Rathnarrow
  Rathwire Lower
  Rathwire Upper
  Ratrass
  Rattin
  Riverdale
  Riverstown
  Sarsfieldstown
  Simonstown
  Sionhill
  Thomastown
  Wadestown
  Wardenstown and Wooddown. Greenan and Mucklin townlands are in the barony of Delvin

References

External links
Killucan civil parish at the IreAtlas Townland Data Base
Killucan civil parish at Townlands.ie
Killucan civil parish at the Placenames Database of Ireland

Civil parishes of County Westmeath